The 1920 New Hampshire football team was an American football team that represented  New Hampshire College of Agriculture and the Mechanic Arts during the 1920 college football season—the school became the University of New Hampshire in 1923. In its fifth season under head coach William "Butch" Cowell, the team compiled a 5–2–1 record, while outscoring their opponents by a total of 124 to 53.

Schedule

The 1920 game was the first meeting between the New Hampshire and Boston University football programs.

Team captain Harold I. Leavitt would go on to become superintendent of properties at the University of New Hampshire from 1947 until his retirement in 1966. He was an inaugural member of the UNH Wildcats Hall of Fame in 1982.

Notes

References

New Hampshire
New Hampshire Wildcats football seasons
New Hampshire football